Samuel Ntamack Ndimba (born 20 October 2001) is a French professional footballer who plays as a striker for Annecy.

Career
Ntamack is a youth product of AS Bondy, Drancy, and Guingamp. He began his senior career with the reserves of Guingamp in 2020, before moving to the Championnat National 2 side Romorantin in the summer of 2022. To start off the 2022–23 season with them he scored 13 goals in 13 games and was one of the top scorers in the division. This earned him a transfer to the Ligue 2 side FC Annecy on 13 January 2023 until 2025. He made his professional debut with Annecy in a 1–1 (4–3) penalty shootout win over ASM Belfort on 22 January 2023.

Personal life
Born in France, Ntamack is of Cameroonian descent.

References

External links
 
 Ligue 2 profile

2001 births
Living people
Sportspeople from Montreuil, Seine-Saint-Denis
French footballers
French sportspeople of Cameroonian descent
En Avant Guingamp players
RC Strasbourg Alsace players
FC Annecy players
Ligue 2 players
Championnat National players
Championnat National 3 players
Association football forwards